"Blind Eye" is a song by the British band Uriah Heep, which was originally released on their fifth studio album The Magician's Birthday in 1972, and the B-side of the "Sweet Lorraine" single. "Blind Eye" was written by Ken Hensley. It charted at #97 in the U.S. Billboard Hot 100. It was included on Uriah Heep's live album Acoustically Driven in 2001.
The song was recorded and mixed at Lansdowne Studios, London, in September 1972.

Personnel
 Mick Box — Guitars
 Lee Kerslake — Drums
 Gary Thain — Bass guitar
 Ken Hensley — Keyboards-Guitars
 David Byron — Lead vocals

References

Uriah Heep (band) songs
1972 singles
Songs written by Ken Hensley
Bronze Records singles
1972 songs